Clomipramine, sold under the brand name Anafranil among others, is a tricyclic antidepressant (TCA). It is used for the treatment of obsessive–compulsive disorder, panic disorder, major depressive disorder, and chronic pain. It may increase the risk of suicide in those under the age of 25. It is primarily taken by mouth. It has also been used to treat premature ejaculation.

Common side effects include dry mouth, constipation, loss of appetite, sleepiness, weight gain, sexual dysfunction, and trouble urinating. Serious side effects include an increased risk of suicidal behavior in those under the age of 25, seizures, mania, and liver problems. If stopped suddenly a withdrawal syndrome may occur with headaches, sweating, and dizziness. It is unclear if it is safe for use in pregnancy. Its mechanism of action is not entirely clear but is believed to involve increased levels of serotonin and norepinephrine.

Clomipramine was discovered in 1964 by the Swiss drug manufacturer Ciba-Geigy. It is on the World Health Organization's List of Essential Medicines. It is available as a generic medication.

Medical uses
Clomipramine has a number of uses in medicine including in the treatment of:

 Obsessive–compulsive disorder (OCD) which is its only U.S. -labeled indication. Other regulatory agencies (such as the TGA of Australia and the MHRA of the UK) have also approved clomipramine for this indication.
 Major depressive disorder (MDD) a popular off-label use in the US. It is approved by the Australian TGA and the United Kingdom MHRA for this indication. Some have suggested the possible superior efficacy of clomipramine compared to other antidepressants in the treatment of MDD, although at the current time the evidence is insufficient to adequately substantiate this claim.
 Panic disorder with or without agoraphobia. 
 Body dysmorphic disorder
 Cataplexy associated with narcolepsy. Which is a TGA and MHRA-labeled indication for clomipramine.
 Premature ejaculation
 Depersonalization disorder
 Chronic pain with or without organic disease, particularly headache of the tension type.
 Sleep paralysis, with or without narcolepsy
 Enuresis (involuntary urinating in sleep) in children. The effect may not be sustained following treatment, and alarm therapy may be more effective in both the short-term and the long-term. Combining a tricyclic (such as clomipramine) with anticholinergic medication, may be more effective for treating enuresis than the tricyclic alone.
 Trichotillomania

In a meta-analysis of various trials involving fluoxetine (Prozac), fluvoxamine (Luvox), and sertraline (Zoloft) to test their relative efficacies in treating OCD, clomipramine was found to be the most effective.

Contraindications
Contraindications include:

 Known hypersensitivity to clomipramine, or any of the excipients or cross-sensitivity to tricyclic antidepressants of the dibenzazepine group
 Recent myocardial infarction
 Any degree of heart block or other cardiac arrhythmias
 Mania
 Severe liver disease
 Narrow angle glaucoma
 Urinary retention
 It must not be given in combination or within 3 weeks before or after treatment with a monoamine oxidase inhibitor. (Moclobemide included, however clomipramine can be initiated sooner at 48 hours following discontinuation of moclobemide.)

Pregnancy and lactation
Clomipramine use during pregnancy is associated with congenital heart defects in the newborn. It is also associated with reversible withdrawal effects in the newborn. Clomipramine is also distributed in breast milk and hence nursing while taking clomipramine is advised against.

Side effects
Clomipramine has been associated with the following side effects:

Very common (>10% frequency):

 Accommodation defect
 Blurred vision
 Nausea
 Dry mouth (Xerostomia)
 Constipation
 Fatigue
 Weight gain
 Increased appetite
 Dizziness
 Tremor
 Headache
 Myoclonus
 Drowsiness
 Somnolence
 Restlessness
 Micturition disorder
 Sexual dysfunction (erectile dysfunction and loss of libido)
 Hyperhidrosis (profuse sweating)

Common (1–10% frequency):

 Weight loss
 Orthostatic hypotension
 Sinus tachycardia
 Clinically irrelevant ECG changes (e.g. T- and ST-wave changes) in patients of normal cardiac status
 Palpitations
 Tinnitus (hearing ringing in one's ears)
 Mydriasis (dilated pupils)
 Vomiting
 Abdominal disorders
 Diarrhoea
 Decreased appetite
 Increased transaminases
 Increased Alkaline phosphatase
 Speech disorders
 Paraesthesia
 Muscle hypertonia
 Dysgeusia
 Memory impairment
 Muscular weakness
 Disturbance in attention
 Confusional state
 Disorientation
 Hallucinations (particularly in elderly patients and patients with Parkinson's disease)
 Anxiety
 Agitation
 Sleep disorders
 Mania
 Hypomania
 Aggression
 Depersonalisation
 Insomnia
 Nightmares
 Aggravation of depression
 Delirium
 Galactorrhoea (lactation that is not associated with pregnancy or breastfeeding)
 Breast enlargement
 Yawning
 Yawn-induced orgasm
 Hot flush
 Dermatitis allergic (skin rash, urticaria)
 Photosensitivity reaction
 Pruritus (itching)

Uncommon (0.1–1% frequency):
 Convulsions
 Ataxia
 Arrhythmias
 Elevated blood pressure
 Activation of psychotic symptoms

Very rare (<0.01% frequency):

 Pancytopaenia — an abnormally low amount of all the different types of blood cells in the blood (including platelets, white blood cells and red blood cells). 
 Leukopenia — a low white blood cell count.
 Agranulocytosis — a more severe form of leukopenia; a dangerously low neutrophil count which leaves one open to life-threatening infections due to the role of the white blood cells in defending the body from invaders. 
 Thrombocytopenia — an abnormally low amount of platelets in the blood which are essential to clotting and hence this leads to an increased tendency to bruise and bleed, including, potentially, internally. 
 Eosinophilia — an abnormally high number of eosinophils — the cells that fight off parasitic infections — in the blood.
 Syndrome of inappropriate secretion of antidiuretic hormone (SIADH) — a potentially fatal reaction to certain medications that is due to an excessive release of antidiuretic hormone — a hormone that prevents the production of urine by increasing the reabsorption of fluids in the kidney — this results in the development of various electrolyte abnormalities (e.g. hyponatraemia [low blood sodium], hypokalaemia [low blood potassium], hypocalcaemia [low blood calcium]). 
 Glaucoma
 Oedema (local or generalised)
 Alopecia (hair loss)
 Hyperpyrexia (a high fever that is above 41.5 °C)
 Hepatitis (liver swelling) with or without jaundice — the yellowing of the eyes, the skin, and mucous membranes due to impaired liver function. 
 Abnormal ECG
 Anaphylactic and anaphylactoid reactions including hypotension
 Neuroleptic malignant syndrome (NMS) — a potentially fatal side effect of antidopaminergic agents such as antipsychotics, tricyclic antidepressants and antiemetics (drugs that relieve nausea and vomiting). NMS develops over a period of days or weeks and is characterised by the following symptoms:
 Tremor
 Muscle rigidity
 Mental status change (such as confusion, delirium, mania, hypomania, agitation, coma, etc.)
 Hyperthermia (high body temperature)
 Tachycardia (high heart rate)
 Blood pressure changes
 Diaphoresis (sweating profusely)
 Diarrhoea
 Alveolitis allergic (pneumonitis) with or without eosinophilia
 Purpura

 Conduction disorder (e.g. widening of QRS complex, prolonged QT interval, PR/PQ interval changes, bundle-branch block, torsade de pointes, particularly in patients with hypokalaemia)

Withdrawal
Withdrawal symptoms may occur during gradual or particularly abrupt withdrawal of tricyclic antidepressant drugs. Possible symptoms include: nausea, vomiting, abdominal pain, diarrhea, insomnia, headache, nervousness, anxiety, dizziness and worsening of psychiatric status. Differentiating between the return of the original psychiatric disorder and clomipramine withdrawal symptoms is important. Clomipramine withdrawal can be severe. Withdrawal symptoms can also occur in neonates when clomipramine is used during pregnancy. A major mechanism of withdrawal from tricyclic antidepressants is believed to be due to a rebound effect of excessive cholinergic activity due to neuroadaptations as a result of chronic inhibition of cholinergic receptors by tricyclic antidepressants. Restarting the antidepressant and slow tapering is the treatment of choice for tricyclic antidepressant withdrawal. Some withdrawal symptoms may respond to anticholinergics, such as atropine or benztropine mesylate.

Overdose

Clomipramine overdose usually presents with the following symptoms:

 Signs of central nervous system depression such as: 
 stupor
 coma
 drowsiness
 restlessness
 ataxia
 Mydriasis
 Convulsions
 Enhanced reflexes
 Muscle rigidity
 Athetoid and choreoathetoid movements
 Serotonin syndrome - a condition with many of the same symptoms as neuroleptic malignant syndrome but has a significantly more rapid onset
 Cardiovascular effects including:
 arrhythmias (including Torsades de pointes)
 tachycardia
 QTc interval prolongation
 conduction disorders
 hypotension
 shock
 heart failure
 cardiac arrest
 Apnoea
 Cyanosis
 Respiratory depression
 Vomiting
 Fever
 Sweating
 Oliguria
 Anuria

There is no specific antidote for overdose and all treatment is purely supportive and symptomatic. Treatment with activated charcoal may be used to limit absorption in cases of oral overdose. Anyone suspected of overdosing on clomipramine should be hospitalised and kept under close surveillance for at least 72 hours. Clomipramine has been reported as being less toxic in overdose than most other TCAs in one meta-analysis but this may well be due to the circumstances surrounding most overdoses as clomipramine is more frequently used to treat conditions for which the rate of suicide is not particularly high such as OCD. In another meta-analysis, however, clomipramine was associated with a significant degree of toxicity in overdose.

Interactions
Clomipramine may interact with a number of different medications, including the monoamine oxidase inhibitors which include isocarboxazid, moclobemide, phenelzine, selegiline and tranylcypromine, antiarrhythmic agents (due to the effects of TCAs like clomipramine on cardiac conduction. There is also a potential pharmacokinetic interaction with quinidine due to the fact that clomipramine is metabolised by CYP2D6 in vivo), diuretics (due to the potential for hypokalaemia (low blood potassium) to develop which increases the risk for QT interval prolongation and torsades de pointes), the selective serotonin reuptake inhibitors (SSRIs; due to both potential additive serotonergic effects leading to serotonin syndrome and the potential for a pharmacokinetic interaction with the SSRIs that inhibit CYP2D6 [e.g. fluoxetine and paroxetine]) and serotonergic agents such as triptans, other tricyclic antidepressants, tramadol, etc. (due to the potential for serotonin syndrome). Its use is also advised against in those concurrently on CYP2D6 inhibitors due to the potential for increased plasma levels of clomipramine and the resulting potential for CNS and cardiotoxicity.

Pharmacology

Pharmacodynamics

Clomipramine is a reuptake inhibitor of serotonin and norepinephrine, or a serotonin–norepinephrine reuptake inhibitor (SNRI); that is, it blocks the reuptake of these neurotransmitters back into neurons by preventing them from interacting with their transporters, thereby increasing their extracellular concentrations in the synaptic cleft and resulting in increased serotonergic and noradrenergic neurotransmission. In addition, clomipramine also has antiadrenergic, antihistamine, antiserotonergic, antidopaminergic, and anticholinergic activities. It is specifically an antagonist of the α1-adrenergic receptor, the histamine H1 receptor, the serotonin 5-HT2A, 5-HT2C, 5-HT3, 5-HT6, and 5-HT7 receptors, the dopamine D1, D2, and D3 receptors, and the muscarinic acetylcholine receptors (M1–M5). Like other TCAs, clomipramine weakly blocks voltage-dependent sodium channels as well.

Although clomipramine shows around 100- to 200-fold preference in affinity for the serotonin transporter (SERT) over the norepinephrine transporter (NET), its major active metabolite, desmethylclomipramine (norclomipramine), binds to the NET with very high affinity (Ki = 0.32 nM) and with dramatically reduced affinity for the SERT (Ki = 31.6 nM). Moreover, desmethylclomipramine circulates at concentrations that are approximately twice those of clomipramine. In accordance, occupancy of both the SERT and the NET has been shown with clomipramine administration in positron emission tomography studies with humans and non-human primates. As such, clomipramine is in fact a fairly balanced SNRI rather than only a serotonin reuptake inhibitor (SRI).

The antidepressant effects of clomipramine are thought to be due to reuptake inhibition of serotonin and norepinephrine, while serotonin reuptake inhibition only is thought to be responsible for the effectiveness of clomipramine in the treatment of OCD. Conversely, antagonism of the H1, α1-adrenergic, and muscarinic acetylcholine receptors is thought to contribute to its side effects. Blockade of the H1 receptor is specifically responsible for the antihistamine effects of clomipramine and side effects like sedation and somnolence (sleepiness). Antagonism of the α1-adrenergic receptor is thought to cause orthostatic hypotension and dizziness. Inhibition of muscarinic acetylcholine receptors is responsible for the anticholinergic side effects of clomipramine like dry mouth, constipation, urinary retention, blurred vision, and cognitive/memory impairment. In overdose, sodium channel blockade in the brain is believed to cause the coma and seizures associated with TCAs while blockade of sodium channels in the heart is considered to cause cardiac arrhythmias, cardiac arrest, and death. On the other hand, sodium channel blockade is also thought to contribute to the analgesic effects of TCAs, for instance in the treatment of neuropathic pain.

The exceptionally strong serotonin reuptake inhibition of clomipramine likely precludes the possibility of its antagonism of serotonin receptors (which it binds to with more than 100-fold lower affinity than the SERT) resulting in a net decrease in signaling by these receptors. In accordance, while serotonin receptor antagonists like cyproheptadine and chlorpromazine are effective as antidotes against serotonin syndrome, clomipramine is nonetheless capable of inducing this syndrome. In fact, while all TCAs are SRIs and serotonin receptor antagonists to varying extents, the only TCAs that are associated with serotonin syndrome are clomipramine and to a lesser extent its dechlorinated analogue imipramine, which are the two most potent SRIs of the TCAs (and in relation to this have the highest ratios of serotonin reuptake inhibition to serotonin receptor antagonism). As such, whereas other TCAs can be combined with monoamine oxidase inhibitors (with caution due to the risk of hypertensive crisis from NET inhibition; sometimes done in treatment-resistant depressives), clomipramine cannot be due to the risk of serotonin syndrome and death. Unlike the case of its serotonin receptor antagonism, orthostatic hypotension is a common side effect of clomipramine, suggesting that its blockade of the α1-adrenergic receptor is strong enough to overcome the stimulatory effects on the α1-adrenergic receptor of its NET inhibition.

Serotonergic activity

Clomipramine is a very strong SRI. Its affinity for the SERT was reported in one study using human tissues to be 0.14 nM, which is considerably higher than that of other TCAs. For example, the TCAs with the next highest affinities for the SERT in the study were imipramine, amitriptyline, and dosulepin (dothiepin), with Ki values of 1.4 nM, 4.3 nM, and 8.3 nM, respectively. In addition, clomipramine has a terminal half-life that is around twice as long as that of amitriptyline and imipramine. In spite of these differences however, clomipramine is used clinically at the same usual dosages as other serotonergic TCAs (100–200 mg/day). It achieves typical circulating concentrations that are similar in range to those of other TCAs but with an upper limit that is around twice that of amitriptyline and imipramine. For these reasons, clomipramine is the most potent SRI among the TCAs and is far stronger as an SRI than other TCAs at typical clinical dosages. In addition, clomipramine is more potent as an SRI than any selective serotonin reuptake inhibitors (SSRIs), it is more potent than paroxetine, which is the strongest SSRI.

A positron emission tomography study found that a single low dose of 10 mg clomipramine to healthy volunteers resulted in 81.1% occupancy of the SERT, which was comparable to the 84.9% SERT occupancy by 50 mg fluvoxamine. In the study, single doses of 5 to 50 mg clomipramine resulted in 67.2 to 94.0% SERT occupancy while single doses of 12.5 to 50 mg fluvoxamine resulted in 28.4 to 84.9% SERT occupancy. Chronic treatment with higher doses was able to achieve up to 100.0% SERT occupancy with clomipramine and up to 93.6% SERT occupancy with fluvoxamine. Other studies have found 83% SERT occupancy with 20 mg/day paroxetine and 77% SERT occupancy with 20 mg/day citalopram. These results indicate that very low doses of clomipramine are able to substantially occupy the SERT and that clomipramine achieves higher occupancy of the SERT than SSRIs at comparable doses. Moreover, clomipramine may be able to achieve more complete occupancy of the SERT at high doses, at least relative to fluvoxamine.

If the ratios of the 80% SERT occupancy dosage and the approved clinical dosage range are calculated and compared for SSRIs, SNRIs, and clomipramine, it can be deduced that clomipramine is by far the strongest SRI used medically. The lowest approved dosage of clomipramine can be estimated to be roughly comparable in SERT occupancy to the maximum approved dosages of the strongest SSRIs and SNRIs. Because their mechanism of action was originally not known and dose-ranging studies were never conducted, first-generation antipsychotics were dramatically overdosed in patients. It has been suggested that the same may have been true for clomipramine and other TCAs.

Obsessive–compulsive disorder
Clomipramine was the first drug that was investigated for and found to be effective in the treatment of OCD. The effectiveness of clomipramine in the treatment of OCD is far greater than that of other TCAs, which are comparatively weak SRIs; a meta-analysis found pre- versus post-treatment effect sizes of 1.55 for clomipramine relative to a range of 0.67 for imipramine and 0.11 for desipramine. In contrast to other TCAs, studies have found that clomipramine and SSRIs, which are more potent SRIs, have similar effectiveness in the treatment of OCD. However, multiple meta-analyses have found that clomipramine nonetheless retains a significant effectiveness advantage relative to SSRIs; in the same meta-analysis mentioned previously, the effect sizes of SSRIs in the treatment of OCD ranged from 0.81 for fluoxetine to 1.36 for sertraline (relative to 1.55 for clomipramine). However, the effectiveness advantage for clomipramine has not been apparent in head-to-head comparisons of clomipramine versus SSRIs for OCD. The differences in effectiveness findings could be due to differences in methodologies across non-head-to-head studies.

Relatively high doses of SSRIs are needed for effectiveness in the treatment of OCD. Studies have found that high dosages of SSRIs above the normally recommended maximums are significantly more effective in OCD treatment than lower dosages (e.g., 250 to 400 mg/day sertraline versus 200 mg/day sertraline). In addition, the combination of clomipramine and SSRIs has also been found to be significantly more effective in alleviating OCD symptoms, and clomipramine is commonly used to augment SSRIs for this reason. Studies have found that intravenous clomipramine, which is associated with very high circulating concentrations of the drug and a much higher ratio of clomipramine to its metabolite desmethylclomipramine, is more effective than oral clomipramine in the treatment of OCD. There is a case report of complete remission from OCD for approximately one month following a massive overdose of fluoxetine, an SSRI with a uniquely long duration of action. Taken together, stronger serotonin reuptake inhibition has consistently been associated with greater alleviation of OCD symptoms, and since clomipramine, at the clinical dosages in which it is employed, is effectively the strongest SRI used medically (see table above), this may underlie its unique effectiveness in the treatment of OCD.

In addition to serotonin reuptake inhibition, clomipramine is also a mild but clinically significant antagonist of the dopamine D1, D2, and D3 receptors at high concentrations. Addition of antipsychotics, which are potent dopamine receptor antagonists, to SSRIs, has been found to significantly augment their effectiveness in the treatment of OCD. As such, besides strong serotonin reuptake inhibition, clomipramine at high doses might also block dopamine receptors to treat OCD symptoms, and this could additionally or alternatively be involved in its possible effectiveness advantage over SSRIs.

Although clomipramine is probably more effective in the treatment of OCD compared to SSRIs, it is greatly inferior to them in terms of tolerability and safety due to its lack of selectivity for the SERT and promiscuous pharmacological activity. In addition, clomipramine has high toxicity in overdose and can potentially result in death, whereas death rarely, if ever, occurs with overdose of SSRIs. It is for these reasons that clomipramine, in spite of potentially superior effectiveness to SSRIs, is now rarely used as a first-line agent in the treatment of OCD, with SSRIs being used as first-line therapies instead and clomipramine generally being reserved for more severe cases and as a second-line agent.

Pharmacokinetics
The oral bioavailability of clomipramine is approximately 50%. Peak plasma concentrations occur around 2–6 hours (with an average of 4.7 hours) after taking clomipramine orally and are in the range of 56–154 ng/mL (178–489 nmol/L). Steady-state concentrations of clomipramine are around 134–532 ng/mL (426–1,690 nmol/L), with an average of 218 ng/mL (692 nmol/L), and are reached after 7 to 14 days of repeated dosing. Steady-state concentrations of the active metabolite, desmethylclomipramine, are around 230–550 ng/mL (730–1,750 nmol/L). The volume of distribution (Vd) of clomipramine is approximately 17 L/kg. It binds approximately 97–98% to plasma proteins, primarily to albumin. Clomipramine is metabolized in the liver mainly by CYP2D6. It has a terminal half-life of 32 hours, and its N-desmethyl metabolite, desmethylclomipramine, has a terminal half-life of approximately 69 hours. Clomipramine is mostly excreted in urine (60%) and feces (32%).

Chemistry
Clomipramine is a tricyclic compound, specifically a dibenzazepine, and possesses three rings fused together with a side chain attached in its chemical structure. Other dibenzazepine TCAs include imipramine, desipramine, and trimipramine. Clomipramine is a derivative of imipramine with a chlorine atom added to one of its rings and is also known as 3-chloroimipramine. It is a tertiary amine TCA, with its side chain-demethylated metabolite desmethylclomipramine being a secondary amine. Other tertiary amine TCAs include amitriptyline, imipramine, dosulepin (dothiepin), doxepin, and trimipramine. The chemical name of clomipramine is 3-(3-chloro-10,11-dihydro-5H-dibenzo[b,f]azepin-5-yl)-N,N-dimethylpropan-1-amine and its free base form has a chemical formula of C19H23ClN2 with a molecular weight of 314.857 g/mol. The drug is used commercially almost exclusively as the hydrochloride salt; the free base has been used rarely. The CAS Registry Number of the free base is 303-49-1 and of the hydrochloride is 17321-77-6.

History
Clomipramine was developed by Geigy as a chlorinated derivative of Imipramine. It was first referenced in the literature in 1961 and was patented in 1963. The drug was first approved for medical use in Europe in the treatment of depression in 1970, and was the last of the major TCAs to be marketed. In fact, clomipramine was initially considered to be a "me-too drug" by the FDA, and in relation to this, was declined licensing for depression in the United States. As such, to this day, clomipramine remains the only TCA that is available in the United States that is not approved for the treatment of depression, in spite of the fact that it is a highly effective antidepressant. Clomipramine was eventually approved in the United States for the treatment of OCD in 1989 and became available in 1990. It was the first drug to be investigated and found effective in the treatment of OCD. The first reports of benefits in OCD were in 1967, and the first double-blind, placebo-controlled clinical trial of clomipramine for OCD was conducted in 1976, with more rigorous clinical studies that solidified its effectiveness conducted in the 1980s. It remained the "gold standard" for the treatment of OCD for many years until the introduction of the SSRIs, which have since largely superseded it due to greatly improved tolerability and safety (although notably not effectiveness). Clomipramine is the only TCA that has been shown to be effective in the treatment of OCD and that is approved by the FDA for the treatment of OCD; the other TCAs failed clinical trials for this indication, likely due to insufficient serotonergic activity.

Society and culture

Generic names
Clomipramina is its generic name in Spanish, Portuguese and Italian and its , while clomipramin is its generic name in German and clomipraminum is its generic name in Latin.

Brand names
Clomipramine is marketed throughout the world mainly under the brand names Anafranil and Clomicalm for use in humans and animals, respectively.

Veterinary uses
In the U.S., clomipramine is only licensed to treat separation anxiety in dogs for which it is sold under the brand name Clomicalm. It has proven effective in the treatment of obsessive–compulsive disorders in cats and dogs. In dogs, it has also demonstrated similar efficacy to fluoxetine in treating tail chasing. In dogs some evidence suggests its efficacy in treating noise phobia.

Clomipramine has also demonstrated efficacy in treating urine spraying in cats.  Various studies have been done on the effects of clomipramine on cats to reduce urine spraying/marking behavior.  It has been shown to be able to reduce this behavior by up to 75% in a trial period of four weeks.

References

External links
 

Alpha-1 blockers
Antihistamines
Chloroarenes
CYP2D6 inhibitors
Novartis brands
Dibenzazepines
Dimethylamino compounds
Dopamine antagonists
Muscarinic antagonists
Obsessive–compulsive disorder
Serotonin receptor antagonists
Serotonin–norepinephrine reuptake inhibitors
Tricyclic antidepressants
World Health Organization essential medicines
Wikipedia medicine articles ready to translate